Yumi is a feminine Japanese and Korean given name.

Japanese name 
 is a common feminine Japanese given name which is occasionally used as a surname.

Orthography 
Yumi can be written using different kanji characters and as a given name can mean:
由美, "origin/history, beauty"
裕美, "abundance, beauty"
夕実, "evening, fruition"
優美, "tenderness, beauty"'
裕未, "abundance, less than"
悠美, "permanence, beauty"
祐美, "savior, beauty"
由実, "origin/history, fruition"
有美, "exist, beauty"
夕美, "evening, beauty"
友美, "friend, beauty"
The given name can also be written in hiragana or katakana.

Given name
, Japanese actress and singer
, Japanese synchronized swimmer
Yumi Asō (奥村 由美), Japanese actress
Yumi Hara (原 由実, born 1985), Japanese voice actress
Yumi Hotta (堀田 由美), Japanese manga artist
, Japanese cross-country skier
Yumi Iwabuchi (岩渕 有美), Japanese Olympic softball player
, Japanese speed skater
Yumi Kakazu (嘉数 由美, born 1973), Japanese voice actress
, Japanese long-distance swimmer
Yumi Kobayashi (小林優美), Japanese fashion model
Yumi Kokamo (小鴨 由水), retired female long-distance runner from Japan
Yumi Kumakura (熊倉 由美), Japanese volleyball player
Yumi Maruyama (丸山 由美), Japanese former Olympic volleyball player
Yumi Matsutoya (松任谷 由実), Japanese singer
Yumi Matsuzawa (松澤 由美), Japanese singer
Yumi Morio (河合 由美), Japanese voice actress
Yumi Nakashima (中島 優美), Japanese singer
Yumi Ohka (阿部 由美子), Japanese professional wrestler
, Japanese voice actress
Yumi Shirakawa (白川 由美), former Japanese actress
Yumi Stynes, Australian disc jockey for the Australian Channel V
Yumi Sugimoto (杉本 有美), Japanese actress
, Japanese curler
Yumi Takada (高田 由美), Japanese voice actress
Yumi Tōma (冬馬 由美 (吉田 由美), Japanese voice actress and singer
, Japanese women's footballer
Yumi Yoshimura (吉村 由美), the second half of the singing duo Puffy AmiYumi
Yumi Yoshiyuki (吉行由美), Japanese film director, actress, and screenwriter

Surname 
Kaoru Yumi (由美かおる), Japanese actress as a stage name

Fictional characters 
Yumi, Otakuthon mascot
Yumi (Ape Escape), a character in the video game Ape Escape
Yumi Yoshimura, a character in the Japanese-American animated television series Hi Hi Puffy AmiYumi
Yumi Fukuzawa (福沢 祐巳), the main character from the novel, manga, and anime series Maria-sama ga Miteru
Yumi Ishiyama, a main character in the French animated television series Code Lyoko and Code Lyoko: Evolution
Yumi Tsoi, an inconsistently-minded, non-carbon alien character. Lives entirely in Artem Syrmolotov's imagination
Farmer Yumi, on the animated television show PAW Patrol
Azusa Yumi (弓 梓), a character from the anime and manga series Soul Eater
Yumi Omura (大村裕美) and yumi the persocom, two characters in the manga and anime series Chobits
Yumi Ozawa, a character from Persona 4
Yumi Sakata, a character in shōjo manga series Doubt!!
Yumi Sawamura (澤村 由美), a character in the action-adventure video game Yakuza
Sayaka Yumi (弓さやか), a character from the Mazinger manga and anime series
Yumi Miyamoto, a character from the Detective Conan manga and anime series
Corporal Yumi Nagumo (南雲弓), the main character of Marine Corps Yumi manga series. Uses the kanji 弓 "bow".
Yumi Komagata, a character from anime and manga series Rurouni Kenshin
Yumi from the Senran Kagura fighting video game franchise
Aiko Yumi, a Japanese college professor and a dateable character in the dating simulation videogame HuniePop
Yumi, a recruitable crew member in Need for Speed: Carbon.

Korean name 

Yumi (유미), also spelled Yoomi, is a common feminine Korean given name.

Orthography 
The meaning of the name differs based on the hanja used to write each syllable. There are 62 hanja with the reading "yu" and 33 hanja with the reading "mi" on the South Korean government's official list of hanja which may be registered for use in given names. Some examples include:

, "having beauty"
, "wandering beauty"
, "gentle beauty"

People
Yumi Hogan (born 1959), South Korean-born American artist and former first lady of Maryland
Ha Yoo-mi (born 1963), South Korean actress
Kim Yoo-mi (actress) (born 1980), South Korean actress
Han Yoo-mi (born 1982), South Korean volleyball player
Hwang Yu-mi (born 1983), South Korean badminton player
Jung Yu-mi (actress, born 1983), South Korean actress
Jeong Yu-mi (actress, born 1984), South Korean actress
Jeon Yu-mi (born 1988), South Korean field hockey player
Kim Yu-mi (beauty pageant titleholder) (born 1990), South Korean beauty pageant titleholder
Kang Yu-mi (born 1991), South Korean football player
Lee Yoo-mi (born 1994), South Korean actress
Patty Yumi Cottrell (born 1981), South Korean-born American writer

Fictional characters
 Kim Yumi, the titular protagonist of South Korean webtoon and drama Yumi's Cells

References

See also 
Yumi
Yumi (disambiguation)

Japanese feminine given names
Japanese-language surnames
Korean feminine given names